The Twana (təw'ánəxʷ) language, also known as Skokomish from one of the tribes that spoke it, belongs to the Salishan family of Native American languages. It is believed by some elders within the Skokomish community (such as Bruce Subiyay Miller) that the language branched off from Lushootseed (dxwəlšucid) because of the region-wide tradition of not speaking the name of someone who died for a year after their death. Substitute words were found in their place and often became normalizing in the community, generating differences from one community to the next. Subiyay speculated that this process increased the drift rate between languages and separated Twana firmly from xwəlšucid (Lushootseed).

The last fluent speaker died in 1980.

The name "Skokomish" comes from the Twana , also spelled , and meaning "river people" or "people of the river".

 directly translated mean 'Twana Language' as where English would be  which means 'English language'.

Phonology

See also
Lushootseed

References

External links 
OLAC resources in and about the Twana language

Languages of the United States
Coast Salish languages
Indigenous languages of the Pacific Northwest Coast
Indigenous languages of Washington (state)